The Ramberg–Osgood equation was created to describe the non linear relationship between stress and strain—that is, the stress–strain curve—in materials near their yield points. It is especially applicable to metals that harden with plastic deformation (see work hardening), showing a smooth elastic-plastic transition. As it is a phenomenological model, checking the fit of the model with actual experimental data for the particular material of interest is essential.

In its original form, the equation for strain (deformation) is

here
  is strain,
  is stress,
  is Young's modulus, and
In this form K and n are not the same as the constants commonly seen in the Hollomon equation.

The equation is essentially assuming the elastic strain portion of the stress-strain curve, can be modeled with a line, while the plastic portion, can be modeling with a power law. The elastic and plastic components are summed to find the total strain.

The first term on the right side, is equal to the elastic part of the strain, while the second term, accounts for the plastic part, the parameters  and  describing the hardening behavior of the material.

Replacing in the first expression, the Ramberg–Osgood equation can be written as

Hardening behavior and yield offset

Due to the power-law relationship between stress and plastic strain, the Ramberg–Osgood model implies that plastic strain is present even for very low levels of stress.

The value  can be seen as a yield offset, as shown in figure 1. This comes from the fact that , when .

Accordingly, (see Figure 1):
 elastic strain at yield = 
 plastic strain at yield =  = yield offset

Values for  can also be found by means of fitting to experimental data, although for some materials, it can be fixed in order to have the yield offset equal to the accepted value of strain of 0.2%, which means:

Alternative Formulations 
Several slightly different alternative formulations of the Ramberg-Osgood equation can be found. As the models are purely empirical, it is often useful to try different models and check which has the best fit with the chosen material.

Alternatively, if the yield stress, is assumed to be at the 0.2% offset strain, the following relationship can be derived. Note that  is again as defined in the original Ramberg-Osgood equation and is the inverse of the Hollomon's strain hardening coefficient.

See also
 Viscoplasticity#Johnson–Cook flow stress model

References

Mechanics
Materials science